Sequenza I is a composition written in 1958 by Luciano Berio for the flutist Severino Gazzelloni. It was first published by Suvini-Zerboni, but the notation was revised much later and this version published by Universal Edition in 1992. It is the first in a series of fourteen Sequenze, each for a different solo instrument (or voice), the last composed in 2002.

External links
"Rhythm and Timing in the Two Versions of Sequenza I for Flute Solo: Psychological and Musical Differences in Performance" by Cynthia Folio, Alexander R. Brinkman (chapter 1 in the book, Berio's Sequenzas, ed. by Janet Halfyard – Ashgate Academic Publishers).

Compositions by Luciano Berio
Contemporary classical compositions
1958 compositions
Solo flute pieces
Serial compositions